is a Japanese television series and is the sixteenth series as part of Toei's Metal Hero Series franchise of tokusatsu programs. It aired from February 23, 1997, to March 1, 1998. It is the first of shows made by Toei in the Metal Hero Series that was aimed at children. It aired alongside Denji Sentai Megaranger on TV Asahi. Kabutack bears some similarities with Robocon, as well as other Toei series, particularly in characters and themes.

Plot
Dr. Torahiko Kouenji is an eccentric genius who dug out the ancient writings from the oldest layer of the earth. He translated the writings and learned the existence of 13  that had been hidden across the planet. If one should obtain all the Star Pieces, any wish could be granted. To that end, Dr. Kouenji built search robots, known as "B-Robots", to find the Star Pieces. However, a trio of such robots, led by Cobrander, were activated without their sleep-education program being completed and thus started to commit bad deeds across the town.

Fortunately, a team, composed of three "good" B-Robots, had completed the whole course of sleep-learning, and befriended Yuzuru Kouenji, Dr. Kouenji's grandson. With Yuzuru, and his friends Sayuri Mitaka and Kuranosuke Kichijouji, the three good B-Robots and the gang begin their search of the "Star Pieces" while overcoming the misdeeds of the three "bad" B-Robots.

Characters
Short for "Bio Elementary Electronic & Transform Locomotive Eexivision Robot," the B-Robots are able to transform into the fighting Super Mode. However, the time limit the mode longs on depends on the B-Robo as the earlier models have shorter timespans compared to the later ones.

B-Robots
 No. 1 : The first B-Robot and the prototype model, built with a rhinoceros beetle-like appearance and a biochip based on the insect. He usually ends his sentences with "kabu". Being the prototype, his Super Mode can only last for 3 minutes. In Super Mode, he wields a weapon called , which is transformed from his helmet in "normal mode". To transform into Super Mode, he needs Yuzuru's , a comm-link-like device.
 : Kabutack's flight form which combined with Tobimasky via .
In Super Mode, Kabutack is equipped with four sets of wheels and a drill in his hand and can use the  attack.
In Super Mode, Kabutack is equipped with propellers on his feet, fins on his arms and a torpedo-launcher in his hand, he can also fire a torpedo called .
 No. 2 : A stag beetle-type robot with a stag beetle biochip. His Super Mode can last for 5 minutes. To transform into Super Mode, he needs Kuranosuke's Friendship Commander.
 No. 3 : The first robot who can do Super Change by himself. He transforms into  by uniting with Kabutack and gives flight capability. The continuation time of Super Mode is 7 minutes. The motif of his biochip is unknown.
 No. 4 : A horseshoe crab-type robot with a horseshoe crab-type biochip, but his ability close to that of a crab. Cobrander's henchman. The continuation time of Super Mode is 9 minutes.
 No. 5 : A spider-type robot with a spider-type biochip. Cobrander's henchman. The continuation time of Super Mode is 11 minutes.
 No. 6 : A pill bug-type robot with a pill bug-type biochip. He can transform into a tire form other than Super Mode. The continuation time of Super Mode is 13 minutes.
 No. 7 : A frog-type robot with a frog-type biochip. The continuation time of Super Mode is 13 minutes.
 No. 8 : A cobra-type robot with a cobra-type biochip. The continuation time of Super Mode is 13 minutes. Super Mode's weapon is the  whip.
 No. 9 : A shark-type robot with a shark-type biochip. The most evil and powerful of the evil B-Robots. The continuation time of Super Mode is 15 minutes. Super Mode's weapons are the  sword and an attacking machine named .
 No. 10 : A ladybug-type robot with a ladybug-type biochip. She is the newest robot which is in Super Mode from the beginning, but she consumes energy highly and does not have combat ability.

A-Robots
They appear in the Kabutack Christmas special.
 : Leader of A-Robots.
 : The combination of Earth Dragon, Sky High, and Sea Gaia. It can use an attack called . It is finally defeated by Kabutack, Blue Beet, and B-Fighter Kabuto.
 : He has the flight ability.
 : A squid-type robot. She has stretchable tentacles and is armed with a sword.
 : cockroach-type robot foot soldiers.

Support Machines
 : A snail-type giant wheel vehicle with a snail-type biochip, it is piloted by Kabutack.
 : A giant robot created by Kabutack with the Star Piece of Sagittarius as countermeasures to TondemoJaws, it is piloted by Kabutack. It transforms from Normal Mode into Super Mode.
 : A giant robot created by Dr. Kouenji with the very first Star Piece of Scorpius he founded; it is piloted by Sharkler. It transforms from Normal Mode into Super Mode. Super Mode's weapons are the  sword, and  saw.

Others
 : He is Kabutack's partner and is Torahiko's grandson. He transforms Kabutack from Normal Form into Super Mode using the Friendship Commander.
 : He is Kuwajiro's partner and is the son of the vice president of Kichijouji construction company. He transforms Kuwajiro from Normal Form into Super Mode using the Friendship Commander.
 : She is a friend of Yuzuru and Kuranosuke and lives in the same apartment as Tentorina.
 : He is Yuzuru's father and is Torahiko's son. He treats Torahiko and B-Robots as a nuisance.
 : She is Yuzuru's mother. She as well as Masatora treats Torahiko and B-Robots as a nuisance.
 : She is Sayuri's rival and is a multimillionaire's daughter.
 : He has a sense of rivalry to Kuranosuke.
 : She is a rookie policewoman who patrols .
 AP717: It is a robot which patrols Asahi with Miki, and the body is similar to Tentorina.
 : He is a greedy storekeeper of an antique shop.
 : He is Yuzuru's grandfather who created B-Robots.
 : A strange dragonfly-type judgement robot who appears whenever both sides battle for a Star Piece (or ). Because he's powerful, everyone has no choice but to play a game of his choice to win the Star Piece. His body becomes red in autumn. During games, he forms a ring with four dragonfly-type machines named .
 : The person who appeared when all Star Pieces were collected. He later becomes his true form named .
 : He is a music teacher of Yuzuru's elementary school, but he resigned to become a singer. His voice is very similar to Kabutack.
 : He is the main antagonist of the Kabutack Christmas special who was once an authority on robotics and is the creator of A-Robots. He is jealous of Dr. Kouenji who is always one step ahead of him.
 Takuya Kai/Blue Beet: Leader of the original B-Fighter team from Juukou B-Fighter, aides Kabutack and B-Fighter Kabuto during the Kabutack Christmas special.
 Kouhei Toba/B-Fighter Kabuto: Hotheaded leader of the second generation of B-Fighters from B-Fighter Kabuto, worked alongside Kabutack and Bluebeet during the Christmas special.

Episodes
 : written by Takashi Yamada, directed by Taro Sakamoto
 : written by Satoru Nishizono, directed by Taro Sakamoto
 : written by Takashi Yamada, directed by Katsuya Watanabe
 : written by Satoru Nishizono, directed by Katsuya Watanabe
 : written by Satoru Nishizono, directed by Hidenori Ishida
 : written by Takashi Yamada, directed by Hidenori Ishida
 : written by Yoshio Urasawa, directed by Taro Sakamoto
 : written by Nobuo Ogizawa, directed by Taro Sakamoto
 : written by Takashi Yamada, directed by Katsuya Watanabe
 : written by Satoru Nishizono, directed by Katsuya Watanabe
 : written by Yoshio Urasawa, directed by Naoki Iwahara
 : written by Satoru Nishizono, directed by Naoki Iwahara
 : written by Takashi Yamada, directed by Hidenori Ishida
 : written by Takashi Yamada, directed by Hidenori Ishida
 : written by Junichi Miyashita, directed by Taro Sakamoto
 : written by Satoru Nishizono, directed by Taro Sakamoto
 : written by Satoru Nishizono, directed by Katsuya Watanabe
 : written by Nobuo Ogizawa, directed by Katsuya Watanabe
 : written by Yoshio Urasawa, directed by Hidenori Ishida
 : written by Takashi Yamada, directed by Hidenori Ishida
 : written by Yoshio Urasawa, directed by Naoki Iwahara
 : written by Satoru Nishizono, directed by Naoki Iwahara
 : written by Satoru Nishizono, directed by Naoki Iwahara
 : written by Takashi Yamada, directed by Taro Sakamoto
 : written by Junichi Miyashita, directed by Taro Sakamoto
 : written by Yoshio Urasawa, directed by Hidenori Ishida
 : written by Nobuo Ogizawa, directed by Hidenori Ishida
 : written by Takashi Yamada, directed by Hidenori Ishida
 : written by Takashi Yamada, directed by Naoki Iwahara
 : written by Takashi Yamada, directed by Naoki Iwahara
 : written by Satoru Nishizono, directed by Taro Sakamoto
 : written by Satoru Nishizono, directed by Taro Sakamoto
 : written by Junichi Miyashita, directed by Hidenori Ishida
 : written by Yoshio Urasawa, directed by Hidenori Ishida
 : written by Takashi Yamada, directed by Katsuya Watanabe
 : written by Satoru Nishizono, directed by Katsuya Watanabe
 : written by Satoru Nishizono, directed by Naoki Iwahara
 : written by Junichi Miyashita, directed by Naoki Iwahara
 : written by Yoshio Urasawa, directed by Taro Sakamoto
 : written by Takashi Yamada, directed by Taro Sakamoto
 : written by Satoru Nishizono, directed by Hidenori Ishida 
 : written by Junichi Miyashita, directed by Hidenori Ishida
 : written by Takashi Yamada, directed by Katsuya Watanabe
 : written by Nobuo Ogizawa, directed by Katsuya Watanabe
 : written by Yoshio Urasawa, directed by Naoki Iwahara
 : written by Satoru Nishizono, directed by Naoki Iwahara
 : written by Takashi Yamada, directed by Hidenori Ishida
 : written by Satoru Nishizono, directed by Hidenori Ishida
 : written by Yoshio Urasawa, directed by Satoshi Morota
 : written by Junichi Miyashita, directed by Satoshi Morota
 : written by Satoru Nishizono, directed by Taro Sakamoto
 : written by Satoru Nishizono, directed by Taro Sakamoto

Special
 is a special that features cameos by Blue Beet from Juukou B-Fighter and the title hero from B-Fighter Kabuto.

Script: Yoshio Urasawa
Director: Katsuya Watanabe

Cast
 : 
 : 
 : 
 : 
 : 
 : 
 : 
 : 
 : 
 : 
 :  (Played as "幸田 磨衣子")
 : 
 : 
The Epic Christmas Battle cast
 Mother: 
 Store worker: 
 Citizen, : 
 Citizen, :  (Played as )
 Santa Claus: 
 :

Voice actors
 : 
 Takeshi Kusao appeared on screen in episode 36 as 
 : 
 : 
 : 
 : 
 : 
 : 
 : 
 : 
 : 
 : 
 AP717: 
 : 
 : 
The Epic Christmas Battle cast
 :

Songs
Opening theme

Lyrics: 
Composition & Arrangement: 
Artist: 
Ending theme

Lyrics: 
Composition & Arrangement: MASAKI
Artist: Takeshi Kusao

1997 Japanese television series debuts
1998 Japanese television series endings
Japanese television shows featuring puppetry
Metal Hero Series
TV Asahi original programming
Television spin-offs
Japanese comedy television series